Rasna can refer to:

 the endonym, or native name of the Etruscans
 Rasna (Požega), a Serbian village
 Řásná, a Czech village
 Rasna, Brestovac, a Croatian village
 Rasna (Brest Region), a village in the Brest Region, Belarus
 Rasna (Mogilev Region), a village in the Mogilev Region, Belarus
 Rasna (Vitebsk Region), a village in the Vitebsk Region, Belarus
 Rasna, an Indian soft drink
 Rasna, a simulation software developer founded in 1987 and acquired by PTC in 1995